The 1931 Women's Western Open was a golf competition held at Midlothian Country Club, the 2nd edition of the event. June Beebe won the championship in match play competition by defeating Mrs. Melvin Jones in the final match, 3 and 2.

Women's Western Open
Golf in Illinois
Women's Western Open
Women's Western Open
Women's Western Open